Peter Patterson (born 3 October 1945) is a former Australian rules footballer who played with Collingwood in the Victorian Football League (VFL).

Patterson started his career in the Wimmera Football League, where he played with Nhill. A wingman, he made his debut for Collingwood in 1965 and the following year played in the side which lost the grand final by a single point. He missed just one game in 1967 but would only add another 20 games in the next three seasons.

He was later the playing coach of Hampden Football League club South Warrnambool.

References

1945 births
Australian rules footballers from Victoria (Australia)
Collingwood Football Club players
Nhill Football Club players
South Warrnambool Football Club players
South Warrnambool Football Club coaches
Living people